William Miller Dennis I (January 18, 1810July 18, 1882) was an American businessman, Democratic politician, and Wisconsin pioneer.  He served in the first session of the Wisconsin State Senate and later served in the State Assembly, representing Dodge County.  He was also the 2nd bank comptroller of Wisconsin, and was the 7th and 10th mayor of Watertown, Wisconsin.

Biography

William M. Dennis was born in Newport County, Rhode Island, in January 1810.  At a young age, he moved to Troy, New York.  He subsequently moved to the Wisconsin Territory in 1837.

He was one of the earliest settlers in what is now Watertown, Wisconsin, and remained there for the rest of his life.  Shortly after his arrival, he was named as the first postmaster in that town.

Politically, Dennis associated with the Democratic Party, which was dominant in the state during these year.  He was elected to the last session of the 4th Wisconsin Territorial Assembly, serving in the Territory's House of Representatives in 1846.  That same year, he was elected as a delegate for Dodge County to Wisconsin's first constitutional convention.  The constitutional document produced by this convention was ultimately rejected by voters, but a subsequent effort secured Wisconsin statehood in 1848.  That February, Dennis was elected from Dodge County to represent them in the first session of the Wisconsin State Senate.

In 1852, he was elected to the Wisconsin State Assembly, representing Dodge County's 3rd Assembly district in the 6th Wisconsin Legislature.  His district comprised the southeast corner of the County.  That Fall, he was the Democratic nominee for the statewide elected position of  state bank comptroller.  He was the first person elected to this office (the previous holder was appointed by the Governor).  He was re-elected in 1855.

Subsequently, Dennis became president of the Wisconsin National Bank and was elected to two non-consecutive terms as mayor of Watertown, in 1862 and 1866.  His association with bad railway bonds significantly damaged his reputation and he never held elected office again after his second mayoral term.  After retiring from the bank, he made significant profitable investments in the region of Watertown, Dakota Territory, which he left to his sons.

He died at his home in Watertown, in September 1882.  His death was sudden and occurred after a period of apparent good health.

Personal life and family
William M. Dennis was married twice.  He had at least one daughter with his first wife.  After his first wife's death, he married Catherine Elizabeth Coughlin and had at least four more children.  He was survived by his second wife and five children.

Electoral history

Wisconsin Bank Comptroller (1853, 1855)

| colspan="6" style="text-align:center;background-color: #e9e9e9;"| General Election, November 4, 1853

| colspan="6" style="text-align:center;background-color: #e9e9e9;"| General Election, November 6, 1855

References

|-

|-

1810 births
1882 deaths
People from Rhode Island
Politicians from Watertown, Wisconsin
Businesspeople from Wisconsin
Mayors of places in Wisconsin
Democratic Party Wisconsin state senators
19th-century American politicians
19th-century American businesspeople
Democratic Party members of the Wisconsin State Assembly